Amanda Fuller (born August 27, 1984) is an American actress. She is best known for being the second actress to portray Kristin Baxter on FOX's Last Man Standing.

Career

Early career
In Buffy the Vampire Slayer, Fuller played Eve, one of the potential slayers who appeared in the final season. In 'Til There Was You, Fuller played the role of Debbie, a 13-year-old whose mature role was played by Jennifer Aniston. In Askari, she played opposite Oscar-winning actress Marlee Matlin.

Present career
Fuller's credits include cult indie film Red White & Blue  and Creature, with appearances in Law & Order: Special Victims Unit, CSI: Crime Scene Investigation, NCIS, 7th Heaven, Judging Amy, Boston Public, Buffy the Vampire Slayer, 8 Simple Rules, The Division, Touched by an Angel, Malcolm in the Middle, The Practice, Without a Trace, L.A. Doctors and That 70s Show and a role in the graphic adventure game Frankenstein: Through the Eyes of the Monster. Fuller directed the Los Angeles production of the theatrical play This is our Youth written by Kenneth Lonergan starring Tyler Williams (of television's Everybody Hates Chris). Fuller was a recurring guest star on the 2012 season of Grey's Anatomy on ABC.

In 2012, Fuller joined the cast of the Tim Allen-starred ABC sitcom Last Man Standing, portraying the role of Kristin Baxter, replacing Alexandra Krosney who played the role in the first season. She also portrayed Madison "Badison" Murphy in the final two seasons of Orange Is the New Black (2018–2019). When ABC  cancelled Last Man Standing and FOX Network picked it up, she signed on to continue playing her role as Kristin Baxter in 2018. Fuller made her debut as a director on Last Man Standing in the season 8 episode "Garage Band".

Personal life
Amanda Fuller graduated from Notre Dame High School in Sherman Oaks, California in 2002. Fuller currently resides in Los Angeles, California and is married to Matthew Bryan Feld. They announced in July 2019 that they were expecting their first child after battling with endometriosis her entire life. On November 19, 2019, she gave birth to a son.

Filmography

Film

Television

Video games

References

External links

1984 births
20th-century American actresses
21st-century American actresses
Actresses from Los Angeles
American child actresses
American film actresses
American television actresses
Living people
Actresses from Sacramento, California
People with Endometriosis